Demetrious Johnson (born August 13, 1986) is an American mixed martial artist. He currently competes in ONE Championship, where he is the current ONE Flyweight Champion (135 lb). He is the inaugural and former UFC Flyweight Champion. Known for his quick striking and elusive movement, Johnson has also landed the most takedowns in UFC flyweight history and co-holds the record for the latest finish in UFC history with a submission win at 4:59 of the fifth round against Kyoji Horiguchi. He is the only UFC fighter to record over 10 takedowns in three different fights. Johnson also holds the record for most finishes in UFC flyweight history with 7. Johnson is widely regarded as one of the greatest mixed martial arts fighters of all time.

ESPN, MMA Weekly, and various UFC personnel have called Johnson one of the greatest mixed martial artists in the world today. Sherdog historically ranked Johnson as the #9-pound-for-pound fighter in mixed martial arts and as the No. 2 flyweight. He is widely regarded as one of the greatest mixed martial artists of all time with many, including UFC Commentator Joe Rogan, considering him the greatest mixed martial artist of all time. He holds the UFC record for most consecutive title defenses at 11.

Early years
Born in Kentucky, Johnson grew up in Parkland, Washington, where he attended Washington High School and was a stand-out athlete in track, wrestling, and cross country. In wrestling, he placed 3rd and 2nd in the state in his junior and senior years. Although he only participated in track and cross country to improve his cardio for wrestling, he competed at the State Championships in both sports. Johnson did receive scholarship offers for wrestling but he did not want to leave his family behind. Ultimately, he did not take up any scholarship offers and instead attended Pierce College for two years while working on the side.

Mixed martial arts career

Early career
Johnson began his career in mixed martial arts (MMA) in 2007 and won his professional debut via first-round knockout. Johnson then appeared on multiple local shows and won his next 8 fights, including five in a row by submission. Johnson fought at the Alaska Fighting Championships in Anchorage and won via head kick KO, which earned him a deal with the WEC.

World Extreme Cagefighting
He made his World Extreme Cagefighting debut at bantamweight against Brad Pickett on April 24, 2010, at WEC 48 in Sacramento, California. Johnson showed good kickboxing throughout but was unable to defend the many takedowns executed by Pickett. Johnson lost via unanimous decision. Joe Rogan predicted during the fight that, should the WEC implement a flyweight division, Johnson would be highly effective, as he was a relatively small bantamweight.

Johnson was expected to face Clint Godfrey on September 30, 2010, at WEC 51. However, Godfrey was forced off the card and replaced by WEC newcomer Nick Pace. Johnson defeated Pace via unanimous decision, handing Pace his first MMA loss.

Johnson defeated Damacio Page via third-round submission on November 11, 2010, at WEC 52. After Page controlled the action in the first round, Johnson was able to dictate the action for most of the second and third rounds before submitting Page via guillotine choke. Johnson later said, "He was basically drowning, and I was the shark that came up and got him from underneath."

Ultimate Fighting Championship

Bantamweight competition (2011–2012)
On October 28, 2010, World Extreme Cagefighting merged with the Ultimate Fighting Championship. As part of the merger, all WEC fighters were transferred to the UFC. Johnson faced Japanese superstar Norifumi Yamamoto on February 5, 2011, at UFC 126 in his UFC debut, Johnson won via unanimous decision.

Johnson was scheduled to face Renan Barão on May 28, 2011, at UFC 130. However, Johnson faced Miguel Torres after Torres's opponent, Brad Pickett, was forced off the card with an injury. Despite breaking his fibula early in the second round from a checked leg kick, Johnson used his superior wrestling to control Torres and won a 29–28 unanimous decision victory, even though he was swept into full mount a record-breaking 6 times during the fight.

Johnson fought Dominick Cruz on October 1, 2011, at UFC Live: Cruz vs. Johnson for the UFC bantamweight title, losing by unanimous decision. Johnson was briefly linked to a bout with Eddie Wineland on January 28, 2012, at the UFC's second event on Fox. However, Johnson was pulled from the bout to take part in a four-man flyweight tournament to determine the UFC's first UFC Flyweight Champion.

Johnson faced Ian McCall on March 3, 2012, in the first round of the Flyweight Tournament at UFC on FX 2. This fight was the first flyweight bout in UFC history. The fight with McCall went all three rounds, was turned over to the judges' score cards and announced as a majority decision win for Johnson. Later, in the post-fight press conference, UFC president Dana White announced that the athletic commission made a mistake when scoring the match and that officially the bout was scored a majority draw (28–28, 29–29, and 29–28 Johnson). A rematch with McCall took place on June 8, 2012, at UFC on FX: Johnson vs. McCall. Johnson won the fight via unanimous decision to progress to the final round of the tournament.

UFC Flyweight Champion (2012–2018)

Johnson faced Joseph Benavidez in the finals of the UFC Flyweight Tournament on September 22, 2012, at UFC 152. Johnson defeated Benavidez via split decision (48–47, 47–48, and 49–46) to become the inaugural UFC Flyweight Champion.

Johnson fought John Dodson on January 26, 2013, at UFC on Fox: Johnson vs. Dodson. Johnson won the fight via unanimous decision (48–47, 49–46, and 48–47) in a bout that earned both participants Fight of the Night honors.

Johnson was expected to face John Moraga on April 13, 2013, at The Ultimate Fighter 17 Finale. However, Johnson was forced out of the bout with an injury, and Moraga was pulled from the event as well. The bout with Moraga eventually took place on July 27, 2013, at UFC on Fox: Johnson vs. Moraga, where Johnson was looking to defend his title for a second time. Johnson won via an armbar submission late in the fifth round. The win also earned Johnson his first Submission of the Night bonus award.

A rematch with Joseph Benavidez was expected for November 30, 2013, at The Ultimate Fighter 18 Finale. However, the bout was moved to December 14, 2013, at UFC on Fox 9 after that event's headliner was postponed due to injury. Johnson won the rematch in emphatic fashion via knockout in the first round, becoming the first person to stop Benavidez. The win also earned Johnson his first Knockout of the Night bonus award. Johnson faced Ali Bagautinov on June 14, 2014, at UFC 174. He successfully defended his title for a fourth time, winning by unanimous decision. Subsequent to his win, on July 10, the British Columbia Athletic Commission (BCAC) announced that Bagautinov tested positive for erythropoietin (EPO) prior to the title fight. In response, the BCAC suspended Bagautinov from mixed martial arts competition for one year.

A bout with Chris Cariaso was expected on August 30, 2014, at UFC 177. However, the bout was shifted to September 27, 2014, at UFC 178 after that event's headliner was cancelled due to injury. Johnson won the fight via submission due to a kimura in the second round. This marked Johnson's fifth title defense and the first time that a kimura was used to end a fight in a UFC championship title bout. Johnson faced Kyoji Horiguchi at UFC 186, winning the one-sided fight via an armbar submission at 4:59 of the fifth round, resulting in the latest finish in UFC history. This win also secured Johnson a Performance of the Night bonus award.

A rematch with John Dodson took place on September 5, 2015, at UFC 191. In a largely one-sided affair, Johnson won the fight via unanimous decision. Johnson faced Olympic Gold Medalist Henry Cejudo on April 23, 2016, at UFC 197. He won the fight via TKO in the first round after dropping Cejudo with a variety of strikes. The win earned Johnson his second Performance of the Night bonus. Johnson next faced Tim Elliott on December 3, 2016, at The Ultimate Fighter 24 Finale. Despite being a heavy favorite, Johnson was taken down for the first time as a flyweight and nearly submitted with a d'arce choke in the first round. He went on to win the remaining rounds, and defended the Championship via a decisive unanimous decision.

Johnson faced Wilson Reis on April 15, 2017, at UFC on Fox 24. He won by armbar submission in the third round and subsequently received a Performance of the Night bonus. With the win, Johnson tied Anderson Silva for most consecutive title defenses (ten) in UFC history. In July 2017, Johnson won an ESPY Award for Fighter of The Year.

Johnson was briefly linked to an August 2017 fight with T.J. Dillashaw. He was scheduled to face Ray Borg on September 9, 2017, at UFC 215. In turn, the fight was canceled a day before the event, as Borg was forced to withdraw from the fight on Thursday evening due to illness. According to multiple sources, Borg has been battling an illness that week and was deemed unfit to fight by UFC doctors. The bout was quickly rescheduled and took place at UFC 216. Johnson won the fight via suplex-to-armbar in the fifth round. This win earned him the Performance of the Night award and set the 11th successful title defense record, surpassing former middleweight champion Anderson Silva's record of 10 in the UFC. Johnson's win was called the best submission of the year from publications such as Sherdog, MMA Mania.com, and The MAC Life.

Johnson faced Cejudo in a rematch at UFC 227 on August 4, 2018, for the UFC Flyweight Championship title. After a record 11 consecutive successful title defenses, Johnson's championship reign came to an end via a split decision loss to Cejudo. This fight earned him the Fight of the Night award. 13 of 25 media outlets scored the bout in favor of Cejudo, while 12 scored it for Johnson.

ONE Championship
On October 27, 2018, Johnson was traded to ONE Championship for former ONE Welterweight Champion Ben Askren. Johnson was expected to make his promotional debut in the first quarter of 2019.

ONE Flyweight Grand Prix
On November 7, 2018, it was announced that Johnson would be one of eight participants in the ONE Flyweight World Grand Prix. On December 19, 2018, it was announced that Johnson will be facing Yuya Wakamatsu at ONE Championship: A New Era on March 31, 2019, in the promotion's inaugural event in Japan.

In his ONE Championship debut, Johnson defeated Yuya Wakamatsu via a guillotine choke submission in the second round.

Johnson's second ONE Championship fight took place at ONE Championship: Dawn of Heroes on August 2, 2019. He faced Tatsumitsu Wada in the semi-finals of the ONE Flyweight Grand Prix and won the fight by unanimous decision to advance to the finals.

Johnson then faced Danny Kingad at ONE Championship: Century in the finals of the ONE Championship Flyweight Grand-Prix on October 12, 2019. He defeated Kingad in a dominant unanimous decision victory and became the ONE Flyweight World Grand Prix Champion.

ONE Flyweight title shot
After claiming the Grand Prix victory, Johnson was set to challenge ONE Flyweight Champion Adriano Moraes at Infinity 1. The fight was postponed due to the COVID-19 pandemic.

Johnson faced Moraes at ONE on TNT 1 on April 7, 2021. The event was held at the Singapore Indoor Stadium in Kallang, Singapore and was broadcast on TNT during US prime time. He lost the bout via KO in round two by a knee and punches.

Special-rules fight with Rodtang Jitmuangnon 
On September 15, 2021, it was announced that Johnson would fight Rodtang Jitmuangnon, the reigning ONE Flyweight Muay Thai World Champion and considered by many to be the current best pound-for-pound Muay Thai fighter. The fight will be contested under special rules, with rounds 1 and 3 being fought under the ONE Muay Thai ruleset, and rounds 2 and 4 being fought under the ONE MMA ruleset. However, due to the pandemic shutdowns, the event was rescheduled for ONE: X on March 26, 2022. Johnson won the bout via a rear-naked choke submission in the second round.

ONE Flyweight Champion (2022-present) 
On June 2, 2022, it was reported that Johnson would rematch Adriano Moraes for the ONE Flyweight Championship at ONE on Prime Video 1. Johnson would go on to defeat Moraes by knockout via a flying knee in the fourth round to capture the ONE Flyweight Championship. This win earned him the Performance of the Night award.

The trilogy bout between Johnson and Moraes is scheduled on May 5, 2023, at ONE Fight Night 10.

Fighting style

UFC commentator Joe Rogan, UFC president Dana White, ESPN.com, and other media outlets have called Johnson the greatest mixed martial artist in the world. Known as one of the fastest fighters in MMA, Johnson's martial arts background is in wrestling, which he uses effectively to control where the fight takes place and land numerous takedowns in a single match when necessary. In addition to his wrestling base, Johnson is also recognized for quick striking and elusive movement. He is noted for his ability to land fast punches and kicks to the head or body, then quickly escape an opponent's reach. He is also known for his ability to counterstrike while standing within the pocket. During upperbody clinches, Johnson has also utilized the Muay Thai plum while mixing in a series of elbows and knees. To complement his traditional wrestling base Johnson is also schooled in Catch wrestling under his long-term coach Matt Hume, as evident by his Catch style direct suplex-to-armlock transition against Ray Borg, and his Double wrist lock submission (aka Kimura) of Chris Cariaso.

Johnson is known for cross-training and visiting other athletes to learn different techniques, like ADCC veteran and fellow ONE Championship fighter Garry Tonon.

Personal life
Johnson had a harsh childhood; he was raised by his deaf mother and an abusive stepfather. Johnson has never met his biological father, "I've never seen a picture of him, not a glimpse, nothing." The main thing that has helped him move on from his past is his wife, Destiny Johnson. He says "she is the best thing that has ever happened to me and without her, life would be incomplete." They were wed May 11, 2012, in Hawaii. They have two sons: Tyron born in 2013, and Maverick born April 15, 2015, and a daughter who was born in August 2018.

Johnson is an avid gamer and streams his gaming via Twitch with username mightygaming.

Championships and accomplishments

Mixed martial arts
ONE Championship
 ONE Flyweight Championship (One time, current)
 2019 ONE Flyweight World Grand Prix Champion 
 Performance of the Night (One time) 
 2022 MMA Knockout of the Year 
Ultimate Fighting Championship
UFC Flyweight Championship (One time, inaugural)
Eleven successful title defenses
UFC Flyweight Championship Tournament Winner
Fight of the Night (Three times) 
Knockout of the Night (One time) 
Submission of the Night (One time) 
Performance of the Night (Four times) 
Most consecutive wins in the UFC flyweight division (13)
Most UFC flyweight title fights (13)
Most wins in UFC flyweight title fights (12)
Third most wins in UFC title fights (12)
Most consecutive title defenses in UFC flyweight division (11)
Most consecutive title defenses in UFC history (11)
Most successful title defenses in UFC history (11) 
Second fighter on UFC roster to be awarded Bonus payments in all four possible categories (Fight, Knockout, Performance & Submission of the Night awards)
MMAJunkie.com
2015 April Submission of the Month
2022 August Knockout of the Month 
Inside MMA
2012 Breakthrough Fighter of the Year
Sherdog
2013 All-Violence First Team
2017 Submission of the Year 
Current No. 1 Pound for Pound Fighter
ESPY Awards
2017 Fighter of The Year
FoxSports.com
2013 Fighter of the Year
Fight Matrix
2013 Male Fighter of the Year
MMA Mania.com
UFC/MMA 'Fighter of the Year' 2017 – Top 5 List No. 3
UFC/MMA 'Submission of the Year' 2017 – Top 5 List No. 1  vs. Ray Borg
 Bleacher Report
 2017 Fighter of the Year
 2017 Submission of the Year  vs. Ray Borg
 ESPN
 2017 Submission of the Year  vs. Ray Borg
 Pundit Arena
 2017 Submission of the Year  vs. Ray Borg
 MMA Fighting
 2017 Submission of the Year  vs. Ray Borg
 Bloody Elbow
 2017 Submission of the Year  vs. Ray Borg
 2017 Best Fighter of the Year
 Wrestling Observer Newsletter
 2017 Most Outstanding Fighter of the Year
World MMA Awards
 2017 Submission of the Year vs. Ray Borg at UFC 216

Mixed martial arts record

|-
|Win
|align=center|31–4–1
|Adriano Moraes
|KO (flying knee)
|ONE on Prime Video 1
|
|align=center|4
|align=center|3:50
|Kallang, Singapore
|
|-
|Loss
|align=center|30–4–1 
|Adriano Moraes
|KO (knee)
|ONE on TNT 1
|
|align=center|2
|align=center|2:24
|Kallang, Singapore
|
|-
|Win 
|align=center|30–3–1 
|Danny Kingad
|Decision (unanimous) 
|ONE: Century Part 1
|
|align=center|3
|align=center|5:00
|Tokyo, Japan 
|
|-
|Win
|align=center|29–3–1
|Tatsumitsu Wada
|Decision (unanimous)
|ONE: Dawn of Heroes
|
|align=center|3
|align=center|5:00
|Pasay, Philippines
|
|-
|Win
|align=center|28–3–1
|Yuya Wakamatsu
|Submission (guillotine choke)
|ONE: A New Era
|
|align=center|2
|align=center|2:40
|Tokyo, Japan
|
|-
|Loss*
|align=center|27–3–1
|Henry Cejudo
|Decision (split)
|UFC 227 
|
|align=center|5
|align=center|5:00
|Los Angeles, California, United States
|
|-
|Win
|align=center|27–2–1
|Ray Borg
|Submission (armbar)
|UFC 216
|
|align=center|5
|align=center|3:15
|Las Vegas, Nevada, United States
|
|-
|Win
|align=center|26–2–1
|Wilson Reis
|Submission (armbar)
|UFC on Fox: Johnson vs. Reis
|
|align=center|3
|align=center|4:49
|Kansas City, Missouri, United States
|
|-
|Win
|align=center|25–2–1
|Tim Elliott
|Decision (unanimous)
|The Ultimate Fighter: Tournament of Champions Finale 
|
|align=center|5
|align=center|5:00
|Las Vegas, Nevada, United States
|
|-
|Win
|align=center|24–2–1
|Henry Cejudo
|TKO (knees to the body)
|UFC 197
|
|align=center|1
|align=center|2:49
|Las Vegas, Nevada, United States
|
|-
|Win
|align=center|23–2–1
|John Dodson
|Decision (unanimous)
|UFC 191
|
|align=center|5
|align=center|5:00
|Las Vegas, Nevada, United States
|
|-
|Win
|align=center|22–2–1
|Kyoji Horiguchi
|Submission (armbar)
|UFC 186
|
|align=center|5
|align=center|4:59
|Montreal, Quebec, Canada
|.
|-
| Win
| align=center| 21–2–1
| Chris Cariaso
| Submission (kimura)
| UFC 178
| 
| align=center| 2
| align=center| 2:29
| Las Vegas, Nevada, United States
| 
|-
| Win
| align=center| 20–2–1
| Ali Bagautinov
| Decision (unanimous) 
| UFC 174
| 
| align=center| 5
| align=center| 5:00
| Vancouver, British Columbia, Canada
| 
|-
| Win
| align=center| 19–2–1
| Joseph Benavidez
| KO (punches)
| UFC on Fox: Johnson vs. Benavidez 2
| 
| align=center| 1
| align=center| 2:08
| Sacramento, California, United States
| 
|-
| Win
| align=center| 18–2–1
| John Moraga
| Submission (armbar)
| UFC on Fox: Johnson vs. Moraga
| 
| align=center| 5
| align=center| 3:43
| Seattle, Washington, United States
| 
|-
| Win
| align=center| 17–2–1
| John Dodson
| Decision (unanimous)
| UFC on Fox: Johnson vs. Dodson
| 
| align=center| 5
| align=center| 5:00
| Chicago, Illinois, United States
| 
|-
| Win
| align=center| 16–2–1
| Joseph Benavidez
| Decision (split)
| UFC 152
| 
| align=center| 5
| align=center| 5:00
| Toronto, Ontario, Canada
| 
|-
| Win
| align=center| 15–2–1
| Ian McCall
| Decision (unanimous)
| UFC on FX: Johnson vs. McCall
| 
| align=center| 3
| align=center| 5:00
| Sunrise, Florida, United States
| 
|-
| Draw
| align=center| 
| Ian McCall
| Draw (majority)
| UFC on FX: Alves vs. Kampmann
| 
| align=center| 3
| align=center| 5:00
| Sydney, New South Wales, Australia
| 
|-
| Loss
| align=center| 14–2
| Dominick Cruz
| Decision (unanimous)
| UFC Live: Cruz vs. Johnson
| 
| align=center| 5
| align=center| 5:00
| Washington D.C., United States
| 
|-
| Win
| align=center| 14–1
| Miguel Torres
| Decision (unanimous)
| UFC 130
| 
| align=center| 3
| align=center| 5:00
| Las Vegas, Nevada, United States
| 
|-
| Win
| align=center| 13–1
| Norifumi Yamamoto
| Decision (unanimous)
| UFC 126
| 
| align=center| 3
| align=center| 5:00
| Las Vegas, Nevada, United States
| 
|-
| Win
| align=center| 12–1
| Damacio Page
| Submission (guillotine choke)
| WEC 52
| 
| align=center| 3
| align=center| 2:27
| Las Vegas, Nevada, United States
| 
|-
| Win
| align=center| 11–1
| Nick Pace
| Decision (unanimous)
| WEC 51
| 
| align=center| 3
| align=center| 5:00
| Broomfield, Colorado, United States
| 
|-
| Loss
| align=center| 10–1
| Brad Pickett
| Decision (unanimous)
| WEC 48
| 
| align=center| 3
| align=center| 5:00
| Sacramento, California, United States
| 
|-
| Win
| align=center| 10–0
| Jesse Brock
| KO (head kick)
| AFC 68
| 
| align=center| 1
| align=center| 1:06
| Anchorage, Alaska, United States
| 
|-
| Win
| align=center| 9–0
| Marshall Carlyle
|  (punches)
| AFC 67
| 
| align=center| 2
| align=center| 0:51
| Anchorage, Alaska, United States
|
|-
| Win
| align=center| 8–0
| Frankie Mendez
| Submission (rear-naked choke)
| KOTC: Thunderstruck
| 
| align=center| 1
| align=center| 4:38
| Everett, Washington, United States
| 
|-
| Win
| align=center| 7–0
| Louis Contreras
| Submission (rear-naked choke)
| Genesis: Rise of Kings
| 
| align=center| 1
| align=center| N/A
| Shoreline, Washington, United States
| 
|-
| Win
| align=center| 6–0
| Forrest Seabourn
| Submission (rear-naked choke)
| Genesis: Cold War
| 
| align=center| 1
| align=center| N/A
| Bellevue, Washington, United States
| 
|-
| Win
| align=center| 5–0
| Jose Garza
| Submission (armbar)
| AX FC 22: Last Man Standing
| 
| align=center| 2
| align=center| 1:56
| Lynnwood, Washington, United States
| 
|-
| Win
| align=center| 4–0
| Louis Contreras
| Submission (keylock)
| USA MMA: Northwest Fighting Challenge 6
| 
| align=center| 1
| align=center| N/A
| Tumwater, Washington, United States
| 
|-
| Win
| align=center| 3–0
| Eric Alvarez
| Decision (unanimous)
| AX FC 20: March Madness
| 
| align=center| 5
| align=center| 5:00
| Lynnwood, Washington, United States
| 
|-
| Win
| align=center| 2–0
| Jeff Bourgeois
| Decision (unanimous)
| AX FC 18: The Art of War
| 
| align=center| 3
| align=center| 5:00
| Lynnwood, Washington, United States
| 
|-
| Win
| align=center| 1–0
| Brandon Fields
| (punch)
| AX FC 16: Annihilation
| 
| align=center| 1
| align=center| 0:17
| Everett, Washington, United States
|}

|-
|Win
| align=center| 2–0
| Lupe Hudgens
| Submission (rear-naked choke)
| ROTR – Rumble on the Ridge
| January 10, 2009
| align=center| 3
| align=center| 1:07
| Snoqualmie, Washington, United States
|
|-
|Win
| align=center| 1–0
| Oren Ulrich
|  (punches)
|GF – Brawl at the Mall 3
|July 29, 2006
| align=center| 1
| align=center| 2:29
| Auburn, Washington, United States
|

Pay-per-view bouts

Mixed rules record

|-
| Win
| align=center| 1–0
| Rodtang Jitmuangnon
| Technical submission (rear-naked choke)
| ONE: X
| 
| align=center|2
| align=center|2:13
| Kallang, Singapore
| 
|-

See also
 List of current ONE fighters
 List of male mixed martial artists
 List of UFC champions

References

Notes

External links
 
 Demetrious Johnson at ONE
 
 
 

American male mixed martial artists
African-American mixed martial artists
People from Madisonville, Kentucky
Mixed martial artists from Washington (state)
Bantamweight mixed martial artists
Living people
1986 births
Ultimate Fighting Championship champions
Flyweight mixed martial artists
People from Parkland, Washington
Mixed martial artists utilizing catch wrestling
Mixed martial artists utilizing pankration
Mixed martial artists utilizing Brazilian jiu-jitsu
American catch wrestlers
American practitioners of Brazilian jiu-jitsu
Pierce College people
Twitch (service) streamers
Ultimate Fighting Championship male fighters
21st-century African-American sportspeople
20th-century African-American people
ONE Championship champions